Kwasi Sintim Aboagye was a Ghanaian politician. He served as member of parliament for the Akim Abuakwa South electoral district from 1954 to 1965. In 1965 he became the member of parliament for Adeiso until February 1966 when the Nkrumah government was overthrown. While in parliament he served as chairman of the bureau for Ghana languages.

Early life and education
Aboagye was born on 20 November 1919 at Asamankese in the Eastern Region of Ghana (then Gold Coast).
He was educated at the Asamankese Presbyterian Primary School from 1927 to 1932. He later moved to the Aburi Presbyterian Boarding School and completed his elementary education in 1937. He entered the Presbyterian Training College at Akropong where he trained as a teacher and obtained his teachers' Certificate 'A' in 1941. He stayed one more year at the college to study theology. He left the college in 1942.

Career
After his studies in college, Aboagye worked as a teacher at Agogo Presbyterian Primary School in the Ashanti Region. In 1945 he was transferred to Akim Oda to work as a Head teacher. He worked at Akim Oda until 1947 when he was transferred to Agona Nsaba. In 1948 he gave up teaching and traded in hand-bags and travelling bags. He stayed in the business until 1951 when became a contractor supplying boards and scantlings. He remained in this business until 1954 when he entered parliament.

Politics
Aboagye was elected into the legislative assembly in 1954 to represent the Akim Abuakwa South electoral district. He served as a member of parliament for the area until 1965. In 1965 he became the member of parliament representing the Adeiso electoral area. He remained a member of parliament until February 1966 when the Nkrumah government was ousted.

Personal life
Aboagye married Adwoa Nyamekye in 1946 and had three children with her. In 1955 he married Juliana Asare with whom he also has three children. He divorced Adwoa Nyamekye in 1959.

See also
 List of MLAs elected in the 1954 Gold Coast legislative election
 List of MLAs elected in the 1956 Gold Coast legislative election
 List of MPs elected in the 1965 Ghanaian parliamentary election

References

1919 births
Ghanaian MPs 1954–1956
Ghanaian MPs 1956–1965
Ghanaian MPs 1965–1966
Convention People's Party (Ghana) politicians
20th-century Ghanaian politicians
Presbyterian College of Education, Akropong alumni
Akan people
Year of death missing
People from Eastern Region (Ghana)